Willis J. Brogden (October 18, 1877 – October 29, 1935) was a justice of the North Carolina Supreme Court from 1926 to 1935.

Born in Goldsboro, North Carolina, Brogden graduated from the University of North Carolina in 1898 and taught at the Fuller School in that city before moving to Durham, North Carolina, in 1901. Brogden continued teaching while reading law and taking night classes at Trinity University (now Duke University) to gain admission to the bar in 1907, after which he practiced law in several firms in Durham from 1907 to 1926. He was elected Mayor of Durham in 1911, serving two terms in that office.

In December 1925, Governor Angus Wilton McLean appointed Brogden to a seat on the North Carolina Supreme Court vacated by the resignation of Lycurgus R. Varser. Brogden was sworn in on January 2, 1926, and was reelected to the court in every subsequent election, continuing in office until his sudden illness and death in 1935. At the time of his death, he had expressed that he anticipated easily winning reelection in 1936.

Brogden was a nephew of North Carolina Governor, Curtis Hooks Brogden.

References

1877 births
1935 deaths
People from Goldsboro, North Carolina
University of North Carolina alumni
Duke University Trinity College of Arts and Sciences alumni
U.S. state supreme court judges admitted to the practice of law by reading law
Mayors of Durham, North Carolina
Justices of the North Carolina Supreme Court